Joshua Israel Kaddu (born March 12, 1990) is a former American gridiron football linebacker. He was drafted by the Miami Dolphins in the fifth round of the 2012 NFL Draft. Kaddu played college football at Oregon.

Early life
Kaddu earned letters in football, basketball and track at Vacaville High School. He finished his senior season ranked third in the Monticello Empire League in tackles with 92 stops (69 unassisted), 5.5 quarterback sacks (3rd in the league) and two interceptions, including a season-high 13 tackles vs. Vallejo. In addition, he also carried the ball 10 times for 78 yards and grabbed five catches for 155 yards and one touchdown on offense. He helped Mike Papadopoulos’ team take home the Sac-Joaquin Section Division I football championship in 2006 with a 37–36 victory against Merced, the school’s first ever football title.

In track & field, Kaddu excelled in jumping events, posting bests of 1.83 meters (6–0) in the high jump, 6.41m (21–0) in the long jump and 13.58m (44–4) in the triple jump. He also competed in hurdles (15.49s in the 110m hurdles) and threw the shot put, posting a top-throw of 14.30 meters (46–10).

Ranked as a three-star recruit by Scout.com, Kaddu was ranked as the 33rd-best strongside linebacker prospect in the country  and was included on its California Top 100 (99th) as one of the state’s top recruits. He was also considered a two-star recruit by Rivals.com.

Professional career

Miami Dolphins
Kaddu was selected by the Miami Dolphins in the 5th round of the 2012 NFL Draft. He was the 155th overall selection and Miami's sixth pick. On October 21, 2013, Kaddu was released by the Dolphins.

Philadelphia Eagles
He was signed by the Philadelphia Eagles to a futures contract on January 7, 2014. He was released on August 30, 2014.

Minnesota Vikings
Kaddu signed with the Minnesota Vikings practice squad on September 9, 2014.  On December 27, 2014 Kaddu was signed to the active roster when fellow linebacker Anthony Barr was placed on injured reserve. He was cut by the Vikings on August 31, 2015.

BC Lions
Kaddu signed with the BC Lions in March 2018.

Personal life
Kaddu grew up in a city called Vacaville, located in the Northern San Francisco Bay Area. Kaddu is one of five siblings (Grace, Nakato, Babirye, Jonathan). Both Kaddu's mother and father are immigrants from Uganda. Before the Idi Amin era, Kaddu's father was a world recognized boxer.

References

External links
Miami Dolphins bio
Oregon Ducks bio

1990 births
Living people
American football linebackers
Miami Dolphins players
Minnesota Vikings players
Oregon Ducks football players
People from Vacaville, California
Philadelphia Eagles players
Players of American football from California
Sportspeople from the San Francisco Bay Area